Evvol are a Berlin based dark synth pop duo. The band consists of Irish woman Julie Chance, her Australian partner Jon Dark (aka Jane Arnison). They have toured extensively with Canadian band Austra Evvol's sound has been described as music that plays on dualities – light and dark, entrapment and escape, immersion and surrender.  Their debut album Eternalism was released on July 24th 2015 via !K7 Records.

Discography

EPs
 Physical L.U.V (2016)

Studio albums
Eternalism (2015)
The Power (2020)

Singles
 No Love (2015)
 Your Love (2015)
 Sola (2015)
 Physical L.U.V (2016)
 Release Me (2018)
 Song For The Broken Hearted (Rollin’) (2018)
 It's Ok (2020)
 Help Myself (2020)
 The Power (2020)
 Speedboat (2020)

References

External links
 

German musical duos
Musical groups from Berlin